Przemysław Edgar Gosiewski (12 May 1964 – 10 April 2010) was a Polish politician and a deputy chair of Law and Justice (Prawo i Sprawiedliwość) party. In the 1980s he was active in the Solidarity movement. In years 2006-2007 he served as a Deputy Prime Minister of Poland in Jarosław Kaczyński's government.

He was elected to the Sejm in 2001 and reelected on 25 September 2005, receiving 31,253 votes in 33 Kielce district as a candidate on the Law and Justice list.

He was the majority leader between 3 November 2005 and 19 July 2006. He has been a minister (Chairman of the Standing Committee of the Council of Ministers) since 14 July 2006. On 8 May 2007 he became Deputy Prime Minister of Poland and held that position until 11 November 2007.

He was listed on the flight manifest of the Tupolev Tu-154 of the 36th Special Aviation Regiment carrying the President of Poland Lech Kaczyński which crashed near Smolensk-North airport near Pechersk near Smolensk, Russia, on 10 April 2010, killing all aboard.

On 16 April 2010, Gosiewski was posthumously awarded the Commander's Cross with Star of the Order of Polonia Restituta and on 29 April 2010, the City Council in Ostrowiec made him an honorary citizen.

See also
 Members of Polish Sejm 2005-2007
 Members of Polish Sejm 2007-2011

References

External links
 Przemysław Edgar Gosiewski – parliamentary page – includes declarations of interest, voting record, and transcripts of speeches.
 An interview with Beata Gosiewska
 Personal page

1964 births
2010 deaths
People from Słupsk
Burials at Powązki Military Cemetery
Law and Justice politicians
Members of the Polish Sejm 2005–2007
Members of the Polish Sejm 2001–2005
Deputy Prime Ministers of Poland
Przemyslaw
Commanders with Star of the Order of Polonia Restituta
Polish Roman Catholics
Victims of the Smolensk air disaster
Members of the Polish Sejm 2007–2011